Cyphosticha is a genus of moths in the family Gracillariidae.

Species
Cyphosticha acrolitha Meyrick, 1908
Cyphosticha albomarginata (Stainton, 1862)
Cyphosticha callimacha (Meyrick, 1920)
Cyphosticha dialeuca Turner, 1940
Cyphosticha microta (Turner, 1894)
Cyphosticha panconita Turner, 1913
Cyphosticha pandoxa Turner, 1913
Cyphosticha pterocola Meyrick, 1914
Cyphosticha pyrochroma (Turner, 1894)

External links
Global Taxonomic Database of Gracillariidae (Lepidoptera)

Gracillariinae
Gracillarioidea genera